"Stay with Me" is the fourth single by the British rock band You Me at Six, taken from their second studio album, Hold Me Down. The single was released as a digital download on 5 September 2010, with the CD single released the following day on 6 September. The very beginning of the song is edited in a radio version of the song.

Music video
The video is directed by Frank Borin, and shows the band playing in a forest in Chatsworth, California.

Track listing
 Digital download

Chart performance
"Stay With Me" entered the UK Rock Chart on 1 August 2010 at number 37, where it remained for two consecutive weeks. In its third week on the chart, the single rose to number 3 before climbing to number 2 on 22 August 2010. On its fifth week on the chart the single climbed to number 12 and to number 7 on 5 September 2010. On its official release, the single climbed five places to a peak of number 2, behind Linkin Park's "The Catalyst".

The single entered the UK Singles Chart on 5 September 2010 at number 175 before climbing to number 52 upon release the following week. This is the band's fourth most successful single and its sixth Top 100 hit; the third single from Hold Me Down.

References

2010 singles
You Me at Six songs
2010 songs
Songs written by Josh Franceschi
Virgin Records singles